Nadir Hassan Zeineddin (born 15 May 2000) is an Argentine professional footballer who plays as a centre-forward for Platense.

Career
Zeineddin joined Platense at the age of fourteen, having previously spent three years with Vélez Sarsfield. He was promoted into Platense's first-team squad during 2020, with the centre-forward penning his first professional contract on 13 November. Zeineddin made the substitute's bench for a Primera Nacional match with Deportivo Morón on 5 December, with manager Juan Manuel Llop subsequently selecting him to come on with thirty-three minutes remaining of a 1–1 home draw; he replaced Daniel Vega. He made his first start on 11 December away to Estudiantes, which preceded one further appearance in a campaign that ended with promotion.

His Primera División debut arrived on 6 March at the Estadio Malvinas Argentinas against Godoy Cruz, as he started and played eighty-one minutes of a 3–1 defeat.

Career statistics
.

Notes

References

External links

2000 births
Living people
People from Vicente López Partido
Argentine people of Arab descent
Argentine footballers
Association football forwards
Primera Nacional players
Argentine Primera División players
Club Atlético Platense footballers
Sportspeople from Buenos Aires Province